Lynda Stoner (born 10 September 1953) is an Australian former actress and animal rights activist. She is the chief executive of Animal Liberation, an animal rights charity.

Stoner was an Animal Justice Party candidate for the Senate representing New South Wales at the 2016 federal election.

Career

In the late 1970s and early 1980s, Stoner was known for several roles on Australian television and was popularly regarded as a sex symbol. She appeared in The Paul Hogan Show, then had leading regular roles in the soap opera The Young Doctors from 1977 to 1979 as Kim Barrington in 303 episodes and followed this with the police drama  Cop Shop as Amanda King In 1985 she played the glamorous villain Eve Wilder in the cult soap opera Prisoner and her character was spectacularly lynched during the infamous episode 600 riot, screened in 1986. This was followed by a guest role in the raunchy drama serial Chances in 1991 where she played a sex therapist and guest role in Home and Away

Stoner worked in theatre, predominantly on stage in productions including Don's Party, Rumors, Are You Lonesome Tonight, and Emerald City. One of her cinema roles is the 1982 exploitation film Turkey Shoot, made during a break from Cop Shop.

In 2011 she appeared in the Australian suspense-thriller film Crawl.

Animal rights activist

Stoner became a prominent spokesperson for animal rights issues in the early 1980s. She currently holds the position of Chief Executive, Animal Liberation NSW. In May 2013, Stoner compared hunting photos to images of child pornography, bestiality, snuff murders, rape and torture.

Stoner is a vegan and in 2008 authored a vegan cookbook.

Personal life

Stoner was married to actor Peter Sumner until his death in 2016. They have a son, Luke (b. April 1984). She was once engaged to media personality, and former senator Derryn Hinch.

Filmography

FILM

TELEVISION

References

External links
 

1953 births
Living people
20th-century Australian actresses
21st-century Australian actresses
Australian animal rights activists
Australian film actresses
Australian soap opera actresses
Australian television actresses
Australian veganism activists
Vegan cookbook writers